The 2000 term of the Supreme Court of the United States began October 2, 2000, and concluded September 30, 2001. The table illustrates which opinion was filed by each justice in each case and which justices joined each opinion.

Table key

2000 term opinions

2000 term membership and statistics
This was the fifteenth term of Chief Justice Rehnquist's tenure, and the seventh consecutive term in which the Court's membership had not changed.

Notes

References

 

Lists of United States Supreme Court opinions by term